Joseph Edward Alfred Greatorex (7 March 1863 — 16 December 1940) was an English first-class cricketer and architect.

The son of R. C. Greatorex, he was born in March 1863 at Kensington. He was educated at Harrow School, where he played for the school cricket eleven. He was described at Harrow as a "sound batsman" and featured in the Harrow v Eton match of 1881, taking figures of 5 for 35 with his slow bowling. Shortly after completing his education at Harrow, Greatorex made two appearances in first-class cricket for the Marylebone Cricket Club, against Hampshire at Southampton and Cambridge University at Fenner's. He scored 18 runs in these two matches, with a highest score of 12. Greatorex was by profession an architect. He died in December 1940 at Uppingham. His brother, Theophilus, was also a first-class cricketer.

References

External links

1863 births
1940 deaths
Sportspeople from Kensington
People educated at Harrow School
Alumni of Trinity College, Cambridge
English cricketers
Marylebone Cricket Club cricketers
19th-century English architects
20th-century English architects